Not In Chronological Order is the debut studio album by American singer-songwriter Julia Michaels, released on April 30, 2021 by Republic Records. The album's subject matter centers on themes as love, self reflection and ideal womanhood.

Upon its release, Not in Chronological Order received generally positive reviews. However, the album became Michael's lowest charting release on the Billboard 200, where it reached number 183; Michaels blamed Republic's lack of promotional support for the album as the cause of its lack of success.

Background
Michaels released her debut single "Issues" in 2017, followed by three extended plays (EP), Nervous System (2017), Inner Monologue Part 1 and Inner Monologue Part 2 (both 2019). In 2020, she released the single "Lie Like This", followed by "All Your Exes" and "Love Is Weird" the following year. On April 9, 2021, Women's Wear Daily announced that Michaels would release her debut studio album on April 30. She confirmed this on April 14, along with the album's name as Not in Chronological Order and its artwork.

Critical reception

At Metacritic, which assigns a normalized rating out of 100 to reviews from mainstream critics, the album has an average score of 70 out of 100, which indicates "generally favorable reviews" based on 5 reviews. Clashs Randy Radic thought Not in Chronological Order is soft in certain parts and "thick with sinew" in others, and equally allows Michaels to showcase her songwriting talent and "charismatic, oh-so-expressive voice". Alexis Petridis of The Guardian considered the album enjoyable and a display of Michaels's talent, but lacking in star quality. Writing for NME, Hannah Mylrea was favorable of its depiction of romance and Michaels's signature one-liners, adding, it "confidently chronicles every dizzying high and crushing blow that love brings – affairs of the heart have, after all, long been Michaels’ specialist songwriting subject".

Track listing

Personnel
Musicians
 Julia Michaels – vocals , background vocals 
 JP Saxe – guitar 
 German – programming 
 The Monsters & Strangerz – programming , guitar , keyboards 
 John Ryan – background vocals, guitar, keyboards, programming ; drums, synthesizer programming 
 David Campbell – string arranger 
 G Koop – guitar 
 India Carney – background vocals 
 Mario Jose – background vocals 
 Michael Pollack – background vocals, keyboards 
 Pierre Luc – guitar 
 Matt Zara – guitar 
 Chris Null – guitar 

Technical
 Randy Merrill – mastering engineer
 Serban Ghenea – mixer
 Ben Rice – engineer, vocal producer 
 Steve Churchyard – engineer 
 John Ryan – engineer, vocal producer 
 Jeff Gunnell – engineer 
 Stefan Johnson – engineer , vocal producer 
 Michael Pollack – engineer, vocal producer 
 Gian Stone – vocal producer 
 The Monsters & Strangerz – vocal producer 
 Bo Bodnar – assistant recording engineer

Charts

Release history

References

2021 debut albums
Julia Michaels albums
Albums produced by the Monsters & Strangerz
Republic Records albums